Robert Wellesley Grosvenor, 2nd Baron Ebury (25 January 1834 – 13 November 1918) was a British politician.

Early life
He was the eldest of five sons and two daughters born to the former Hon. Charlotte Arbuthnot Wellesley and Robert Grosvenor, 1st Baron Ebury. His younger brothers were Thomas George Grosvenor, Norman Grosvenor (who represented Chester in Parliament), Algernon Henry Grosvenor, and barrister Richard Cecil Grosvenor.

His mother was the eldest daughter of the diplomat Henry Wellesley, 1st Baron Cowley (a younger brother of Arthur Wellesley, 1st Duke of Wellington).  Together, they had including: His father was the third son of Robert Grosvenor, 1st Marquess of Westminster. Among Robert's extended family were uncles Richard Grosvenor, 2nd Marquess of Westminster, and Thomas Egerton, 2nd Earl of Wilton, while Hugh Lupus Grosvenor, 1st Duke of Westminster, and Richard Grosvenor, 1st Baron Stalbridge, were his cousins.

He was educated at Harrow School and King's College London. Grosvenor played three first-class cricket matches for the Marylebone Cricket Club between 1861 and 1863.

Career
He entered the 1st Life Guards in 1853, became Captain in 1859, and was made Captain of the Cheshire Yeomanry in 1870. He served as Liberal Party Member of Parliament for Westminster from 1865 to 1874.

Personal life
On 20 July 1867, he married Emilie Beaujolais White, daughter of Henry White, 1st Baron Annaly. They had five children, including:

 Robert Victor Grosvenor, 3rd Baron Ebury (1868–1921), who married Florence Padelford, a daughter of Edward M. Padelford, in 1908.
 Hon. Hugh Grosvenor (1869–1900), a Second Secretary in the Diplomatic Service who died unmarried.
 Hon. Maud Grosvenor (1874–1948), who married Maurice George Carr Glyn, High Sheriff of Hertfordshire, second son of Hon. Pascoe Glyn MP and grandson of George Glyn, 1st Baron Wolverton), in 1897.
 Gilbert Grosvenor (1878–1891), who died young.
 Hon. Alice Katherine Sibell Grosvenor (1880–1948), who married Ivor Guest, 1st Viscount Wimborne, in 1902.
 Francis Egerton Grosvenor, 4th Baron Ebury (1883–1932), who married Mary Adela Glasson, a daughter of John Glasson, in 1902.

Upon his death in 1918, his son Robert Victor, succeeded him to the peerage as the 3rd Baron Ebury.

References

External links
Robert Wellesley Grosvenor, 2nd Baron Ebury at the National Portrait Gallery, London
Grosvenor, Robert Wellesley, (1834–1918), 2nd Baron Ebury, politician at The National Archives

1834 births
1918 deaths
People educated at Harrow School
Alumni of King's College London
Robert Grosvenor, 2nd Baron Ebury
Liberal Party (UK) MPs for English constituencies
UK MPs 1865–1868
UK MPs 1868–1874
Ebury, Robert Grosvenor, 2nd Baron
Ebury, Robert Grosvenor, 2nd Baron
British Life Guards officers
Cheshire Yeomanry officers
English cricketers
Marylebone Cricket Club cricketers